John Donald Blackburn (May 14, 1938 – February 4, 2023) was a Canadian professional ice hockey left winger who played in the National Hockey League (NHL) with the Boston Bruins, Philadelphia Flyers, New York Rangers, New York Islanders and Minnesota North Stars. He also played in the World Hockey Association (WHA) with the New England Whalers. After retiring in 1976 he became a coach with the Whalers, and remained in that position through 1981, serving as their first coach when they joined the NHL in 1979 as the Hartford Whalers.

Playing career
Except for a six-game stint with the Boston Bruins, Blackburn spent the majority of the early portion of his career with various minor league teams. He was a dominant force with the Quebec Aces of the AHL during the mid-1960s, including a 36-goal performance in 1965–66. He was selected by the Philadelphia Flyers in the NHL expansion draft and was a regular contributor during the first two years of the fledgling team's existence. In 1969, he was traded to the New York Rangers, but he played sparingly in two years with the team. He was claimed by the New York Islanders in the 1972 expansion draft, but was traded to the Minnesota North Stars late in the season. He finished his career with three seasons with the WHA's Whalers, scoring 59 points in 1973–74.

Coaching career
Blackburn was the first ever Hartford Whalers coach. He led them to a 27–34–19 record in the 1979–80 NHL season. In the playoffs, the Whalers were swept by Montreal in three games. Blackburn was fired midway through the 1980–81 season after the Whalers sat with a record of 15–29–16. He was replaced by interim coach Larry Pleau.

Career statistics

Regular season and playoffs

NHL coaching record

References

External links
 

1938 births
2023 deaths
Baltimore Clippers players
Boston Bruins players
Buffalo Bisons (AHL) players
Canadian ice hockey coaches
Canadian ice hockey left wingers
Cape Codders players
Hamilton Tiger Cubs players
Hartford Whalers announcers
Hartford Whalers coaches
Kingston Frontenacs (EPHL) players
Minnesota North Stars players
National Hockey League broadcasters
New England Whalers coaches
New England Whalers players
New York Islanders players
New York Rangers players
Quebec Aces (AHL) players
Philadelphia Flyers players
Providence Reds players
Rochester Americans players
Sportspeople from Kirkland Lake
Vancouver Canucks (WHL) players